1989 general election may refer to:

1989 Antigua and Barbuda general election
1989 Argentine general election
1989 Botswana general election
1989 Cook Islands general election
1989 Indian general election
1989 Irish general election
1989 Jamaican general election
1989 South African general election
1989 Spanish general election
1989 Uruguayan general election